In the Book of Genesis, Jehovah-jireh or Yahweh Yireh was the location of the binding of Isaac, where Yahweh told Abraham to offer his son Isaac as a burnt offering. Abraham named the place after God provided a ram to sacrifice in place of Isaac.

Translations
The first word of the phrase is the Tetragrammaton, YHWH, the most common name of God in the Hebrew Bible, which is usually given the pronunciation Yahweh in scholarly works. Jehovah is a Christian anglicized vocalization of this name using the vowels of Adonai. Following a Jewish tradition of not pronouncing God's proper name, YHWH is generally translated in English bibles as "the " or "" in capital letters, just as in Jewish worship it is traditionally not pronounced but the word Adonai or Elohim ("God") is used instead.

The early Septuagint translation into Greek gives the meaning as "The Lord hath seen." One Latin version of the Christian Bible rendered the name in Latin as Dominus videt ("The  sees"). The King James Version follows this meaning, as quoted above.

Jewish translations of the verse into English include,

Interpretation
Some Jewish commentators see the name as alluding to the future importance of the place as the site of Solomon's Temple. The Targumim do not regard "Jehovah-jireh" as a proper name.

Considering the passive construction of Abraham's words in verse 14, "In the mount of the  it shall be seen", Calvin comments that it teaches "that God not only looks upon those who are his, but also makes his help manifest to them..." John Wesley and Matthew Henry go further, suggesting that "perhaps it may refer to God manifest in the flesh."

Other modern usage
John Newton translates "Jehovah-jireh" as "The Lord will provide" in his hymn, "When Troubles Assail." 
It is also the title of a William Cowper hymn.

Jehovah Jireh is the title of an 1867 book by William Plumer.

"Jehovah Jireh" is the title of several modern songs, including one by Don Moen included on his 1986 debut album Give Thanks; various others have covered it, including thrash metal band Deliverance on their 1989 self-titled debut album.

Chandra Currelley performed another song with the same title in the 2006 play What's Done in the Dark.

R&B singer Frank Ocean also uses the name "Jehovah Jireh" in his debut album/mixtape Nostalgia, Ultra in the song is titled 'We All Try".

Organizations bearing the name include Jehovah Jireh Children's Homes in Kenya, founded by Manasses Kuria, and churches such as Jehovah Jireh Samoan Assembly of God in Victorville, California, United States.

Maverick City Music and Elevation Worship released a song called "Jireh" in 2021.

See also
 Jehovah-nissi
 Jehovah-shammah

Notable people
 Jireh Swift Billings, son of Franklin S. Billings, Jr.

References

Hebrew words and phrases in the Hebrew Bible
Torah places